The Loramie Creek AVA is an American Viticultural Area located in Shelby County, Ohio.  The area includes  surrounding Loramie Creek, southwest of the county seat of Sidney.

References 

American Viticultural Areas
Ohio wine
Geography of Shelby County, Ohio
1982 establishments in Ohio